The 1986–87 League of Ireland First Division season was the second season of the League of Ireland First Division.

Overview
The First Division was contested by 10 teams and Derry City F.C. won the division.

Final table

See also
 1986–87 League of Ireland Premier Division

References

League of Ireland First Division seasons
2
Ireland